Bárbara Padilla (born December 9, 1980) is a Mexican-American operatic soprano. She was the runner-up on the fourth season of America's Got Talent. She is well known as a survivor of Hodgkin's lymphoma.

Personal life 
Bárbara Padilla was born in Guadalajara, Mexico where she studied music, acting, and dance.

Health 
During her undergraduate studies, Padilla was diagnosed with Hodgkin lymphoma and underwent several rounds of chemotherapy and radiation. During this time, Padilla was told that she might never be able to sing again because the radiation could harm her vocal cords. 

After traveling to Houston for a consultation with doctors, Padilla had the chance to audition for the Moores School of Music at the University of Houston. She was awarded a full scholarship where she completed the master's degree program, all while battling cancer. Padilla is in remission, living in Texas with her husband.

Accomplishments 
Padilla's accomplishments while at UH include first-place winner in NATS competition in 2001 in the advanced adults category and participated in the summer program IIVArts held in Chiari, Italy. She was invited to sing the American and Mexican National Anthems for the sold-out, historic soccer game at Reliant Stadium. She also performed as a soloist of many symphonic events, including oratorio and concerts in USA, Italy and Mexico.

Her repertoire includes operas like La bohème, Turandot, Tosca, Madame Butterfly, and La traviata. She released her first CD in 2014.

America's Got Talent

Overview
Padilla auditioned on America's Got Talent, singing "O Mio Babbino Caro". She then advanced to the Vegas Verdicts, where she then moved on to the Top 48. During the quarterfinals, she sang "Time to Say Goodbye" by Andrea Bocelli, with the judges stating she's the leader of the night. She then advanced to the semifinals, singing "Ave Maria". One of the judges claimed it was the best vocal performance in the history of the show, and she was clearly one of the favorites. During the finals, she sang the same song from her audition. She finished as runner-up, losing to country singer Kevin Skinner.

Performances/Results

Career
After finishing as the runner up, Barbara performed in the America's Got Talent Live concert. Her self-titled debut album was released in late 2014.

References

External links
Barbara Padilla website

1980 births
Living people
America's Got Talent contestants
American operatic sopranos
Mexican operatic sopranos
Singers from Guadalajara, Jalisco
Hispanic and Latino American musicians
American musicians of Mexican descent
University of Houston alumni
Mexican emigrants to the United States
21st-century American women opera singers
21st-century American opera singers
21st-century Mexican women opera singers
Hispanic and Latino American women singers